French submarine Brumaire (Q60) was a Laubeuf type submarine built for the French Navy prior to World War I. She was the name ship of her class.

Design and construction 
Brumaire was ordered by the French Navy as part of its 1906 programme and was laid down at the Cherbourg Naval Yard in October of that year. Work progressed slowly, and she was not launched until 29 April 1911. She was commissioned on 20 March 1912. 
Brumaire was equipped with licence-built M.A.N. diesel engines for surface propulsion, and electric motors for power while submerged. She carried eight torpedoes, two internally and six externally.
Brumaire was named for a month of the French Revolutionary calendar.

Service history
Brumaire was in service during the First World War and saw action throughout on patrol and close blockade duty. 
She remained on active duty at the end of hostilities, when many of her class were de-commissioned. Brumaire was stricken and disarmed in 1928, and scrapped in 1930.

Notes

Bibliography

 Moore, J: Jane’s Fighting Ships of World War I (1919, reprinted 2003)

External links
 Brumaire at Sous-marins Français 1863 -  (French)

Brumaire-class submarines
World War I submarines of France
1911 ships
Ships built in France